Rubén Óscar Cecco (born 10 January 1983 in Buenos Aires) is an Argentine former professional footballer who played as a striker.

Teams
 Boca Juniors 1999–2002
 Deportivo Saquisilí 2002
 San José 2002
 Independiente Petrolero 2003
 Fancesa 2004
 Plaza Amador 2005
 Persekabpas Pasuruan 2005
 Persma Manado 2006
 Persiraja Banda Aceh 2007
 Persija Jakarta 2007–2008
 Bella Vista 2008
 Dinamo Tirana 2009
 San Telmo 2009
 Sportivo Luqueño 2010
 Al-Ittihad 2010–2011
 Miramar Misiones 2012
 Ragusa Calcio 2013–2014
 Teuta Durrës 2014–2015

References

External links
 
 Career details at BDFA

1983 births
Living people
Argentine footballers
Argentine expatriate footballers
Footballers from Buenos Aires
Club San José players
C.A. Bella Vista players
C.D. Plaza Amador players
Persija Jakarta players
FK Dinamo Tirana players
Sportivo Luqueño players
Al-Ittihad Aleppo players
Miramar Misiones players
KF Teuta Durrës players
Liga 1 (Indonesia) players
Argentine expatriate sportspeople in Albania
Argentine expatriate sportspeople in Panama
Argentine expatriate sportspeople in Bolivia
Argentine expatriate sportspeople in Ecuador
Argentine expatriate sportspeople in Indonesia
Argentine expatriate sportspeople in Paraguay
Argentine expatriate sportspeople in Syria
Argentine expatriate sportspeople in Uruguay
Argentine expatriate sportspeople in Italy
Expatriate footballers in Albania
Expatriate footballers in Panama
Expatriate footballers in Bolivia
Expatriate footballers in Ecuador
Expatriate footballers in Indonesia
Expatriate footballers in Paraguay
Expatriate footballers in Syria
Expatriate footballers in Uruguay
Expatriate footballers in Italy
Association football midfielders